Eldon Lawrence "Don" Costello ( - October 24, 1945) was an American actor of stage, screen and radio.

Background
Costello was born in New Orleans, where Jesuit Fathers educated him. His initial plans to study law gave way to his interest in acting..

Career
In the mid 1920s, Costello was stage manager for the Wright Players in Louisville, Kentucky. Later in that decade, he acted with the Majestic Players in Elmira, New York.

Costello entered films in 1935 and in 1939 was put under contract with MGM. Known for his wicked sense of humor, Costello oftentimes played the role of a menace or a tough guy. He is probably best known for his role as Lefty in the movie Here Comes Mr. Jordan (1941). He appeared in 37 movies (31 times credited), including Another Thin Man (1939), Johnny Eager (1941) and The Blue Dahlia (1946).

Accidental Death
Costello died of an overdose of sleeping tablets. His wife, Louise, found him dead in the bedroom of their home at 13424 Valley Vista Street, Sherman Oaks. He had earlier complained of being unable to get to sleep.

Broadway roles
 Jerry-for-Short (1929) - Anthony La Vere 
 The Last Mile (1930) - Drake
 Face the Music (1933) - Louis / Mr. O'Ryan 
 The Ghost of Yankee Doodle (1937) - Ockleford

Partial filmography

 Another Thin Man (1939) - 'Diamond Back' Vogel
 Joe and Ethel Turp Call on the President (1939) - Fred
 One Crowded Night (1940) - Lefty
 Wildcat Bus (1940) - Sid Casey
 Sleepers West (1941) - Carl Izzard
 Ride on Vaquero (1941) - Redge
 I'll Wait for You (1941) - Police Sergeant Brent
 Here Comes Mr. Jordan (1941) - Lefty
 Whistling in the Dark (1941) - 'Noose' Green
 Last of the Duanes (1941) - Jim Bland
 Unholy Partners (1941) - Georgie Pelotti
 Johnny Eager (1941) - Billiken
 Joe Smith, American (1942) - Mead
 Sundown Jim (1942) - Dobe Hyde
 A-Haunting We Will Go (1942) - Doc Lake
 Just Off Broadway (1942) - George Dolphin
 A Night to Remember (1942) - Eddie Turner
 Truck Busters (1943) - Anthony 'Tony' Bonetti
 Air Raid Wardens (1943) - Heydrich
 Crime Doctor (1943) - Nick Ferris
 A Lady Takes a Chance (1943) - Drunk
 Murder on the Waterfront (1943) - Gordon Shane - 'The Great Rajah'
 Texas Masquerade (1944) - Ace Maxson
 Rationing (1944) - Ace (uncredited)
 The Whistler (1944) - Lefty Vigran aka Gorss (uncredited)
 Mystery Man (1944) - Bud Trilling
 Here Come the Co-Eds (1945) - Diamond (uncredited)
 Great Stagecoach Robbery (1945) - Jed Quinlan
 It's in the Bag! (1945) - Mickey (uncredited)
 Nob Hill (1945) - Steve, Fighting Bartender (uncredited)
 Along Came Jones (1945) - Leo Gledhill
 Incendiary Blonde (1945) - Gus Vettori (uncredited)
 Marshal of Laredo (1945) - Henchman Pretty Boy Murphy
 Follow That Woman (1945) - Nick
 The Red Dragon (1945) - Charles Masack
 Crime of the Century (1946) - Joe, Bartender
 The Blue Dahlia (1946) - Leo (final film role)

References

External links 

 
 

1900s births
1945 deaths
American male film actors
American male stage actors
Metro-Goldwyn-Mayer contract players
20th-century American male actors
Burials at Forest Lawn Memorial Park (Glendale)
Actors from New Orleans
Deaths in Calabria